Duingal is a locality in the Bundaberg Region, Queensland, Australia.

Geography 
The Burnett River forms the northern boundary of the suburb.

Duingal Creek flows from south (Booyal) to north through the locality where it becomes a tributary of the Burnett River.

The Bruce Highway enters from Booyal to the south and traverses the south-west of the locality and then crosses the Burnett River into Wallaville.

History 
The locality presumably takes its name from the Duingal Creek, which in turn was named by Lewis H. Maynard and is believed to an Aboriginal word, either dewingal or tewingal meaning scrub iron bark from which spears were made.

Duingal Provisional School opened  circa 1896. It became Duingal State School on 1 January 1909. It closed temporarily in 1909 and 1911 due to low student numbers and finally closed late 1913 or early 1914.

Education 
There are no schools in Duingal. The nearest primary schools are in Wallaville, Booyal and Givelda. The nearest secondary school is in Gin Gin.

References 

Bundaberg Region
Localities in Queensland